Warwick is a town in Lincoln County, Oklahoma, United States. The population was 184 at the 2020 census, up from 148 in 2010.

Geography
Warwick is located in western Lincoln County at  (35.685847, -97.007987). Oklahoma State Highway 66 runs through the center of the Warwick town limits, passing south of the residential portion of the town. Both highways lead west  to Oklahoma City and northeast  to Tulsa. U.S. Route 177 passes through the west side of Warwick, leading north  to Stillwater and south  to Shawnee.

The Deep Fork passes through the west side of the town, flowing east toward the North Canadian River at Eufaula.

Demographics

At the 2000 census there were 235 people, 85 households, and 66 families living in the town. The racial makeup of the town was 94.04% White, 1.70% African American, 1.28% Native American, and 2.98% from two or more races. Hispanic or Latino of any race were 0.85%.

Of the 85 households 35.3% had children under the age of 18 living with them, 63.5% were married couples living together, 10.6% had a female householder with no husband present, and 21.2% were non-families. 18.8% of households were one person and 9.4% were one person aged 65 or older. The average household size was 2.76 and the average family size was 3.09.

The age distribution was 28.5% under the age of 18, 8.5% from 18 to 24, 25.5% from 25 to 44, 23.4% from 45 to 64, and 14.0% 65 or older. The median age was 38 years. For every 100 females, there were 97.5 males. For every 100 females age 18 and over, there were 95.3 males.

The median household income was $28,438 and the median family income  was $36,250. Males had a median income of $26,250 versus $27,946 for females. The per capita income for the town was $15,344. About 4.6% of families and 8.8% of the population were below the poverty line, including 18.9% of those under the age of eighteen and 6.5% of those sixty five or over.

References

Towns in Lincoln County, Oklahoma
Towns in Oklahoma